Atallah Mohammed Abdullah (born 10 July 1960) is an Iraqi weightlifter. He competed in the 1992 Summer Olympics.

References

1960 births
Living people
Weightlifters at the 1992 Summer Olympics
Iraqi male weightlifters
Olympic weightlifters of Iraq
Asian Games medalists in weightlifting
Weightlifters at the 1986 Asian Games
Asian Games silver medalists for Iraq
Medalists at the 1986 Asian Games
20th-century Iraqi people